Stomatia phymotis, common name the swollen stomatella, is a species of sea snail, a marine gastropod mollusk in the family Trochidae, the top snails.

Description
The size of the shell varies between 7 mm and 35 mm. The lengthened, solid shell is ear-shaped. It has a scalar spire. The body whorl descends very deeply. The shell is lusterless, red, marked at the suture, keel and base with olive or brown articulated with white. The surface is very rough, with a strong double nodulous keel at the middle of the whorl, several nodose spiral riblets and threads below it, strongly. The shell is plicate or puckered below the sutures. The aperture is irregular-oval and nacreous inside.

There is considerable variation in both form and color.

Distribution
This marine species occurs in the Red Sea, Central and East Indian Ocean, East India, Indo-Malaysia, Oceania, the Philippines, Japan, Australia (Northern Territory, Queensland, Western Australia) and Indonesia.

References

 Gmelin, J.F. & Linnaeus, C. 1791. Caroli a Linné Systema Naturae per regna tria naturae, secundum classes, ordines, genera, species, cum characteribus, differentis, synonymis, locis. Editio decima tertia aucta, reformata. Lipsiae : G.E. Beer.
 Adams, A. 1850. An arrangement of Stomatellidae, including the characters of a new genus Cumingia, with some additional generic characters. Proceedings of the Zoological Society of London 1850(18): 29–40, pl. 8
 Melvill, J.C. & Standen, R. 1901. The Mollusca of the Persian Gulf, Gulf of Oman, and the Arabian Sea, as evidenced mainly through the collections of Mr. F.W. Townsend, 1893–1900; with descriptions of new species. Proceedings of the Zoological Society of London 1901(ii): 327–460 pls xxi–xxiv 
 Allan, J. 1935. Australian shells: ear shells and wide-mouthed shells. Australian Museum Magazine 5(9): 320–324, 5 figs
 Cotton, B.C. 1945. Southern Australian Gastropoda. Part 1. Streptoneura. Transactions of the Royal Society of South Australia 69(1): 150–171
 Cotton, B.C. 1959. South Australian Mollusca. Archaeogastropoda. Handbook of the Flora and Fauna of South Australia. Adelaide : South Australian Government Printer 449 pp
 Maes, V.O. 1967. The littoral marine mollusks of Cocos-Keeling Islands (Indian Ocean). Proceedings of the Academy of Natural Sciences, Philadelphia 119: 93–217
 Cernohorsky, W.O. 1974. Type specimens of Mollusca in the University Zoological Museum Copenhagen. Records of the Auckland Institute and Museum 11: 143–195
 Sharabati, D. 1984. Red Sea Shells. London : KPI Limited 128 pp.
 Wells, F.E. & Bryce, C.W. 1988. Seashells of Western Australia. Perth : Western Australian Museum 207 pp.
 Wilson, B. 1993. Australian Marine Shells. Prosobranch Gastropods. Kallaroo, Western Australia : Odyssey Publishing Vol. 1 408 pp. 
 Moolenbeek, R.G. 1995. Gastropods (Gastropoda). pp. 24–186 in Dance, S.P. (ed). Seashells of Eastern Arabia. Dubai : Motivate Publishing.
 Higo, S., Callomon, P. & Goto, Y. 1999. Catalogue and Bibliography of the Marine Shell-bearing Mollusca of Japan. Japan : Elle Scientific Publications 749 pp
 Wilson, B. 2002. A Handbook to Australian Seashells on Seashores East to West and North to South. Sydney : Reed New Holland 185 pp
 Poppe G.T., Tagaro S.P. & Dekker H. (2006) The Seguenziidae, Chilodontidae, Trochidae, Calliostomatidae and Solariellidae of the Philippine Islands. Visaya Supplement 2: 1–228. page(s): 102

External links
 

phymotis
Gastropods described in 1779